Indre Eidsfjord Church is a parish church of the Church of Norway in Sortland Municipality in Nordland county, Norway. The church is located in the village of Holmstad on the island of Langøya. The church is one of the three churches for the Sortland parish which is part of the Vesterålen prosti (deanery) in the Diocese of Sør-Hålogaland. The white, wooden church was built in a long church style in 1970 using plans drawn up by the architect Rolf Harlew Jenssen. The church seats about 280 people. It was consecrated on 14 June 1970.

See also
List of churches in Sør-Hålogaland

References

Sortland
Churches in Nordland
Wooden churches in Norway
20th-century Church of Norway church buildings
Churches completed in 1970
1970 establishments in Norway
Long churches in Norway